Manoi (Chao Phom Manoi) was king of the southern Laotian Kingdom of Champasak from 1813 to 1820. He was appointed by the King of Siam in 1813

Kings of Champasak
Year of birth missing
Year of death missing
Place of birth missing
Place of death missing
19th-century Laotian people

References